Chetopa–St. Paul USD 505 is a public unified school district headquartered in Chetopa, Kansas, United States.  The district includes the communities of Chetopa, St. Paul, and nearby rural areas.

Schools
The school district operates the following schools:

 Schools in Chetopa
 Chetopa High School
 Chetopa Junior High School
 Chetopa Elementary School

 Schools in St. Paul
 St. Paul High School
 St. Paul Junior High School
 St. Paul Elementary School

See also
 Kansas State Department of Education
 Kansas State High School Activities Association
 List of high schools in Kansas
 List of unified school districts in Kansas

References

External links
 

School districts in Kansas
Education in Labette County, Kansas
Education in Neosho County, Kansas